The Portland metropolitan area is a metro area in the U.S. states of Oregon and Washington  centered on the principal city of Portland, Oregon. The U.S. Office of Management and Budget (OMB) identifies it as the Portland–Vancouver–Hillsboro, OR–WA Metropolitan Statistical Area, a metropolitan statistical area used by the United States Census Bureau (USCB) and other entities. The OMB defines the area as comprising Clackamas, Columbia, Multnomah, Washington, and Yamhill Counties in Oregon, and Clark and Skamania Counties in Washington. The area had a population of 2,512,859 at the  2020 census.

The Oregon portion of the metropolitan area is the state's largest urban center, while the Washington portion of the metropolitan area is the state's third-largest urban center after Seattle and Spokane (the Seattle Urban Area includes Tacoma and Everett). Portions of the Portland metro area (Clackamas, Multnomah, and Washington Counties) are under the jurisdiction of Metro, a directly elected regional government which, among other things, is responsible for land-use planning in the region.

Metropolitan statistical area

As of the 2010 census, there were 2,226,009 people, 867,794 households, and 551,008 families residing within the MSA. The racial makeup of the MSA were as follows:
 White: 76.3%
 Hispanic or Latino (of any race): 10.9% (8.5% Mexican, 0.4% Spanish or Spaniard, 0.3% Guatemalan, 0.3% Puerto Rican, 0.2% Cuban, 0.2% Salvadoran, 0.1% Peruvian)
 Asian: 5.7% (1.2% Chinese, 1.2% Vietnamese, 0.7% Indian, 0.6% Filipino, 0.6% Korean, 0.4% Japanese)
 Black or African American: 2.9%
 American Indian and Alaskan Native: 0.9%
 Pacific Islander: 0.5% (0.1% Native Hawaiian, 0.1% Guamanian or Chamorro, 0.1% Samoan)
 Two or more races: 4.1%
 Some other race: 4.9%

In 2010 the median income for a household in the MSA was $53,078 and the median income for a family was $64,290. The per capita income was $27,451.

The Portland–Vancouver–Hillsboro Metropolitan Statistical Area (MSA), the 23rd largest in the United States, has a population of 2,226,009 (2010 Census). Of them, 1,789,580 live in Oregon (46.7% of the state's population) while the remaining 436,429 live in Washington (6.7% of state's population). It consists of Multnomah, Washington, Clackamas, Columbia and Yamhill counties in Oregon, as well as Clark and Skamania counties in Washington. The area includes Portland and the neighboring cities of Vancouver, Beaverton, Gresham, Hillsboro, Milwaukie, Lake Oswego, Oregon City, Fairview, Wood Village, Troutdale, Tualatin, Tigard, West Linn, Battle Ground, Camas and Washougal.

Changes in house prices for the metro area are publicly tracked on a regular basis using the Case–Shiller index; the statistic is published by Standard & Poor's and is also a component of S&P's 20-city composite index of the value of the U.S. residential real estate market.

Portland-Vancouver-Salem Combined Statistical Area

As of March 2020, the Portland–Vancouver–Salem, OR–WA Combined Statistical Area (CSA) consists of five Metropolitan Statistical Areas, covering nine counties in Oregon and three counties in Washington:
 Portland-Vancouver-Hillsboro, OR-WA Metropolitan Statistical Area (five counties in Oregon - Multnomah, Washington, Clackamas, Yamhill, Columbia; two counties in Washington State - Clark and Skamania); population 2,492,412 (2019 estimate)
 Salem, OR Metropolitan Statistical Area (Marion and Polk counties); population 430,404 (2019 estimate)
 Albany-Lebanon, OR Metropolitan Statistical Area (Linn county); population 127,451 (2019 estimate)
 Longview, WA Metropolitan Statistical Area (Cowlitz county); population 108,752 (2019 estimate)
 Corvallis, OR Metropolitan Statistical Area (Benton county); population 92,442 (2019 estimate)

The 2019 population estimate is 3,259,710, ranked 18th largest in the United States (2,921,408 based on the 2010 Census).

This area includes the Portland–Vancouver–Hillsboro, OR–WA Metropolitan Statistical Area; Salem, OR Metropolitan Statistical Area, and other surrounding areas.

Cities and other communities
Major cities in the region in addition to Portland include Beaverton, Gresham, Hillsboro in Oregon, and Vancouver in Washington. The area also includes the smaller cities of Corbett, Cornelius, Fairview, Forest Grove, Gladstone, Happy Valley, King City, Lake Oswego, Milwaukie, Oregon City, Sherwood, Tigard, Troutdale, Tualatin, West Linn, Wilsonville, Wood Village in Oregon, as well as Battle Ground, Camas, Washougal, Ridgefield, La Center and Yacolt in Washington.

It includes the unincorporated suburban communities in Oregon of Aloha, Beavercreek, Boring, Cedar Mill, Clackamas, Damascus, Dunthorpe, Garden Home, Raleigh Hills, and West Slope, as well as Hazel Dell, Minnehaha, Salmon Creek, Walnut Grove and Orchards in Washington.

Major
Portland
Vancouver
Hillsboro
Gresham
Beaverton

Other

Amity
Battle Ground
Banks
Barlow
Camas
Canby
Carlton
Clatskanie
Columbia City
Cornelius
Dayton
Dundee
Durham
Estacada
Fairview
Forest Grove
Gaston
Gladstone
Happy Valley
Johnson City
King City
La Center
Lafayette
Lake Oswego
Maywood Park
McMinnville
Milwaukie
Molalla
Newberg
North Bonneville
North Plains
Oregon City
Prescott
Rainier
Ridgefield
Rivergrove
St. Helens
Sandy
Scappoose
Sheridan
Sherwood
Stevenson
Tigard
Troutdale
Tualatin
Vernonia
Washougal
West Linn
Willamina
Wilsonville
Wood Village
Woodland
Yacolt
Yamhill

Transportation

Portland is where Interstate 84 starts at Interstate 5, both major highways in the Pacific Northwest. Other primary roads include Interstate 205, an eastern bypass of the urban core, U.S. Route 26, which heads west and southeast, U.S. Route 30, which follows the Oregon side of the Columbia River northwest and east, mirrored by Washington State Route 14 east from Vancouver, and Oregon Route 217, which connects US 26 with I-5 in the south, travelling through Beaverton. Both US 26 and US 30 go to the Oregon Coast. SR 500 runs from Interstate 5 to SR 503. Padden Parkway runs from NE 78th St and east to NE 162nd Ave.

Transit service on the Oregon side is generally provided by TriMet. In addition, Sandy Area Metro serves Sandy, South Clackamas Transportation District serves nearby Molalla, Canby Area Transit serves Canby and South Metro Area Regional Transit serves Wilsonville. Service in Clark County is provided by C-Tran. In Columbia County, the Columbia County Rider provides transit service on weekdays connecting St. Helens with downtown Portland and connecting Scappoose and St. Helens with certain points in urban Washington County, including the PCC Rock Creek campus, Tanasbourne and the Willow Creek MAX light rail station.

Major airports
Portland International Airport
Portland-Hillsboro Airport
Salem Municipal Airport
Portland-Troutdale Airport

Passenger rail
Amtrak trains serve Portland Union Station. The Coast Starlight runs from Los Angeles to Seattle while Cascades connects Eugene to Vancouver, BC. The Empire Builder heads east to Chicago.

Major highways

State highways, numbered as Interstate, U.S. and Oregon Routes, in the metropolitan area include:

 Interstate 5
 Interstate 84
 Interstate 205
 Interstate 405
 U.S. Route 26
 U.S. Route 30
 U.S. Route 30 Business

 State Route 14
 State Route 500
 State Route 503

Notable highways never built, or removed altogether, include Mount Hood Freeway, Interstate 505, and Harbor Drive.

Sports
The Portland MSA is home to a number of professional and semi-professional sports teams, including the NBA's Portland Trail Blazers, the Portland Timbers of Major League Soccer, the Portland Thorns FC of the National Women's Soccer League and the Portland Loggers of the North American Rugby League. Other teams include the Portland Pickles and the Hillsboro Hops. Portland is also home to two NCAA Division 1 universities, the Portland State Vikings and the Portland Pilots.

The Portland MSA also hosts a number of amateur sports, including college and high school sports. The high school rugby championships are held annually in the Portland MSA, and draw crowds of 8,000 to 10,000 supporters.

Politics

The Portland metropolitan area is heavily Democratic and has voted for that party's presidential candidate in every election since 1988. This is helped by Multnomah County, which has given the Democratic nominee over 70% of the vote in every election since 2004.

References

External links
 Metro government website
 Portland MSA 2010 Census numbers from the Population Resource Center
 pdx.edu/media/p/r/PRC_2007_Population_Report2_rev.pdf of key urban planning documents on the Portland Metropolitan area, at Portland State University

 
 
 
Regions of Oregon
Regions of Washington (state)
Metropolitan areas of Oregon
Metropolitan areas of Washington (state)
Combined statistical areas of the United States